Negotino is a municipality in eastern North Macedonia. Negotino is also the name of the town where the municipal seat is found. Negotino Municipality is part of Vardar Statistical Region.

Geography
The municipality borders
 Štip Municipality to the north,
 Konče and Demir Kapija municipalities to the east,
 Gradsko and Rosoman municipalities to the west, and
 Kavadarci Municipality to the south.

Demographics
According to the last national census of 2021, the municipality has a population of 18,194 people, with a density of 45,05 people/km².

In the census of 1994 there were 18,341 people living within the borders of the municipality.

Ethnic groups in the municipality:

Inhabited places
The number of inhabited places in the municipality is 19, one town and 18 villages.

References

External links
 Official website

 
Vardar Statistical Region
Municipalities of North Macedonia